Events in the year 1165 in Japan.

Events
January 30 – Emperor Goshirakawa holds an opening ceremony for the Sanjūsangendō, a temple built by Taira no Kiyomori. (Traditional Japanese Date: Seventeenth Day of the Twelfth Month, 1164)

References

 
 
Japan
Years of the 12th century in Japan